James Densmore (February 3, 1820 – September 16, 1889) was an American businessman, inventor and vegetarian. He was a business associate of Christopher Sholes, who along with Carlos Glidden and Samuel W. Soule helped contribute to inventing one of the first practical typewriters at a machine shop located in Milwaukee, Wisconsin.<ref>Invention of the Typewriter , Wisconsin Historical Marker, Retrieved May 11, 2008.</ref>

It was believed that Densmore had suggested splitting up commonly used letter combinations in order to solve a jamming problem, but called in question. This concept was later refined by Sholes and became known as the QWERTY key layout.

Densmore was a militant vegetarian. His diet consisted of mostly raw apples. His brother was physician Emmet Densmore.

Densmore also supported women's suffrage in Wisconsin. When he was the editor of the Oshkosh True Democrat the paper publicly supported women's right to vote.

 References 

 Bibliography 
Johnson, Rossiter, et al. (1904).  The Twentieth Century Biographical Dictionary of Notable Americans''.  The Biographical Society

1820 births
1889 deaths
19th-century American businesspeople
19th-century American inventors
American suffragists
American vegetarianism activists
Businesspeople from Milwaukee
Engineers from New York (state)
People from Leicester, New York
Typewriters